Cristina Rey (born 2 April 1976) is a Spanish backstroke swimmer who competed in the 1992 Summer Olympics.

References

1976 births
Living people
Spanish female backstroke swimmers
Olympic swimmers of Spain
Swimmers at the 1992 Summer Olympics